Mohd Syazwan Bin Mohd Roslan (born 22 March 1988) is a Malaysian footballer. His preferred position is as a defender and mainly as a right-back.

Career
Syazwan started his professional career in Perak youth squad. He signed to play with Perlis FA for the 2007–2008 season. He returned to play with Perak from 2009 season, where he played until the end of 2016.

References

External links
 
 Mohd Syazwan profile at Seladang.net

1988 births
Living people
Malaysian footballers
Perlis FA players
Perak F.C. players
People from Perak
Malaysian people of Malay descent
Association football defenders